The battle of Torfou-Tiffauges  was a battle on 19 September 1793 during the War in the Vendée. It pitted many Royalist military leaders against Republican troops under Jean-Baptiste Kléber and Canclaux.

Course 
15,000 men, detached as the Armée de Mayence from the Armée du Rhin after the fall of Mainz, were sent to reinforce Kléber's force. On 18 September, Charette and the Armée catholique et royale gathered again at Torfou, on the northern borders of Tiffauges.

The following day, at 9 am, fire was exchanged for the first time. Kléber launched one battalion to the right of Torfou and one to its left, attempting to encircle the town. The Vendéens under Charette coming towards them were discovered, fired on and forced into retreat. However, the women in the rear blocked the fleeing troops and convinced them to regroup and fight on the plateau where the Republicans were advancing.

François Henri d'Elbée de La Sablonière entered the line and Bonchamps tried to outflank the Republican left. Engulfed in Royalist troops, Kléber advanced four cannons but was shot in the shoulder before realising his centre had collapsed.

Consequences 
The Royalists decided to profit from the victory by pursuing the enemy and attacked Montaigu, where general Beysser was defeated. On 2 September, the Royalist leaders decided they must support Bonchamps and his attack on Kléber. However, Charette and Lescure decided to march on Saint-Fulgent, where the Republican army had arrived. This disobedience had one immediate result – on his return to Montaigu, Charette learned that Kléber had escaped to Bonchamps. He grouped his army and returned to Legé.

External links
 Torfou-Tiffauges

Battles of the War in the Vendée
Battles in Pays de la Loire
History of Vendée
History of Maine-et-Loire
History of Loire-Atlantique
Conflicts in 1793